Marko Kvasina (born 20 December 1996) is an Austrian professional footballer who plays as a forward for Turkish club Göztepe. He is of Croatian descent.

Club career
In July 2017, he joined Twente in the Netherlands.

International career
He represented Austria in the 2013 FIFA U-17 World Cup, 2015 UEFA European Under-19 Championship and the 2019 UEFA European Under-21 Championship.

References

External links

1996 births
Footballers from Vienna
Austrian people of Croatian descent
Living people
Austrian footballers
Austria youth international footballers
Austria under-21 international footballers
Association football forwards
First Vienna FC players
FK Austria Wien players
FC Twente players
SV Mattersburg players
K.V. Oostende players
FC Luzern players
Göztepe S.K. footballers
Austrian Regionalliga players
Austrian Football Bundesliga players
Eredivisie players
Belgian Pro League players
Swiss Super League players
TFF First League players
Austrian expatriate footballers
Expatriate footballers in the Netherlands
Austrian expatriate sportspeople in the Netherlands
Expatriate footballers in Belgium
Austrian expatriate sportspeople in Belgium
Expatriate footballers in Switzerland
Austrian expatriate sportspeople in Switzerland
Expatriate footballers in Turkey
Austrian expatriate sportspeople in Turkey